The GAZ-14 Chaika is an automobile manufactured by the Gorkovsky Avtomobilny Zavod (GAZ, Gorky Automobile Plant) from 1977 to 1988 as a generation of its Chaika marque.

History
The vintage 1950s-style GAZ-13 was succeeded by the more modern GAZ-14 Chaika introduced in 1977 (although production of both versions overlapped by several years). Although visually modern and fitted with the latest electronic luxury features, the GAZ-14 was in fact built around the drivetrain and undercarriage of the older model. The GAZ-14 engine was a modernized  equipped with twin four-barrel carburetors and achieved  SAE gross. A four-door convertible, the 14-05, appeared in 1982.

The GAZ-14 Chaika remained in production from 14 October 1977 to 1988, when the Chaika limousine brand was discontinued.

Around a hundred GAZ-14 were built each year, with total production (including units assembled in 1989 from spare parts) reaching 1,114. On orders from Mikhail Gorbachev, the blueprints and tooling were destroyed as part of his "fighting privileges" campaign under perestroika.

References

Cars of Russia
1980s cars
GAZ Group vehicles
Soviet automobiles
Cars introduced in 1977